Mir Suhail (born 25 June 1989) is a political cartoonist from Jammu and Kashmir.

Education and career 

During April 2015 Nepal earthquake Qadri's cartoon on biased media coverage of Indian media went viral on social networking sites after Nepal social media users criticized mainstream Indian media for insensitive coverage and started a trend on  Twitter and Facebook #GoHomeIndianMedia

Achievements 
Airports Authority of India selected his sketches for their calendar and New Year greeting cards after he won a national competition in the year (2012).

References

1989 births
Living people
Indian cartoonists
21st-century Indian male artists
21st-century Indian journalists
Journalists from Jammu and Kashmir
Kashmiri journalists
Indian male journalists
People from Srinagar
Qadiri order